Australian English (AuE) is a non-rhotic variety of English spoken by most native-born Australians. Phonologically, it is one of the most regionally homogeneous language varieties in the world. Australian English is notable for vowel length contrasts which are absent from most English dialects.

Vowels

The vowels of Australian English can be divided according to length. The long vowels, which include monophthongs and diphthongs, mostly correspond to the tense vowels used in analyses of Received Pronunciation (RP) as well as its centring diphthongs. The short vowels, consisting only of monophthongs, correspond to the RP lax vowels.  There exist pairs of long and short vowels with overlapping vowel quality giving Australian English phonemic length distinction.

There are two families of phonemic transcriptions of Australian English: revised ones, which attempt to more accurately represent the phonetic sounds of Australian English; and the Mitchell-Delbridge system, which is minimally distinct from Jones' original transcription of RP. This page uses a revised transcription based on Durie and Hajek (1994) and Harrington, Cox and Evans (1997) but also shows the Mitchell-Delbridge equivalents as this system is commonly used for example in the Macquarie Dictionary and much literature, even recent.

In Australian English,  is restricted to unstressed syllables, as in most dialects.
 The trap-bath split is a regional variable in Australia, with the  vowel  being more common in South Australia than elsewhere. This is due to the fact that that state was settled later than the rest of Australia, when the lengthened pronunciation was already a feature of London speech. Research done by  shows that the word graph is pronounced with the  vowel by 86% speakers from Adelaide, whereas 100% speakers from Hobart use the  vowel in this word: . There are words in which the  vowel is much less common; for instance, Crystal reports that both the word grasp and the verb to contrast are most commonly pronounced with the  vowel: , . This also affects the pronunciation of some placenames; Castlemaine is locally , but speakers from outside of Victoria often pronounce that name  by analogy to the noun castle in their local accent.

Monophthongs
The aforementioned phrase fish and chips as pronounced by an Australian ( in narrow transcription) can sound a lot like feesh and cheeps to speakers of New Zealand English and other dialects, whereas words such as bit and sit may sound like beat and seat, respectively.
The sound  is usually pronounced as a diphthong (or disyllabically , like ) only in open syllables.
  tends to be higher than the corresponding vowel in General American or RP. The typical realization is close-mid , although for some speakers it may be even closer  (according to John Wells, this pronunciation can occur only in Broad varieties).
See salary-celery merger.
The sound  is traditionally transcribed and analysed the same as the short , but minimal pairs exist in at least some Australians' speech. In South Australia, plant is usually pronounced with the vowel sound , as in rather and father.
There is æ-tensing before a nasal consonant.  The nasal sounds create changes in preceding vowels because air can flow into the nose during the vowel. Nasal consonants can also affect the articulation of a vowel. Thus, for many speakers, the  vowel in words like jam, man, dam and hand is shifted towards . This is also present in General American and Cockney English. Length has become the main difference between words like 'ban' and 'Ben', with 'ban' pronounced  and 'Ben' pronounced .
 
 is pronounced as open front  by many younger speakers.
As with New Zealand English, the / vowel in words like park , calm  and farm  is central (in the past even front) in terms of tongue position and non-rhotic. This is the same vowel sound used by speakers of the Boston accent of North Eastern New England in the United States. Thus the phrase park the car is said identically by a New Zealander, Australian or Bostonian. This vowel is only distinguished from the  vowel by length, thus: park  versus puck .
At the time,  was suitable for any mid central vowel, rounded or unrounded.
 The schwa  is a highly variable sound. For this reason, it is not shown on the vowel charts to the right. The word-final schwa in comma and letter is often lowered to  so that it strongly resembles the  vowel : . The word-initial schwa (as in enduring ) is typically mid : . In the word-internal position (as in bottom ),  is raised to : , as in American English roses .

Diphthongs
The vowel  has an onset , except before laterals.
As a result, the pairs full/fool and pull/pool differ phonetically only in vowel length for those speakers. The usual allophone is further forward in New South Wales than Victoria. It is moving further forwards, however, in both regions at a similar rate.
The first element of  may be raised and rounded in broad accents.
 is shifted to  among some speakers. This realisation has its roots in South Australia, but is becoming more common among younger speakers across the country.
The phoneme  is rare and almost extinct. Many cases of RP  are pronounced instead with the  phoneme in Australian English. "pour" and "poor", "more" and "moor" and "shore" and "sure" are homophones, but "tore" and "tour" remain distinct.

Examples of vowels

One needs to be very careful of the symbol , which represents different vowels: the  vowel in the Harrington, Cox and Evans (1997) system (transcribed  in the other system), but the  vowel in the Mitchell-Delbridge system (transcribed  in the other system).
The fourth column is the OED transcription, taken from the OED website.

It differs somewhat from the ad hoc Wikipedia transcription used in this article. In a few instances the OED example word differs from the others given in this table; these are appended at the end of the second column following a semicolon.

Consonants 
Australian English consonants are similar to those of other non-rhotic varieties of English. A table containing the consonant phonemes is given below.

Non-rhoticity
Australian English is non-rhotic; in other words, the  sound does not appear at the end of a syllable or immediately before a consonant. So the words butter , here  and park  will not contain the  sound.

Linking and intrusive 
The  sound can occur when a word that has a final  in the spelling comes before another word that starts with a vowel. For example, in car alarm the sound  can occur in car because here it comes before another word beginning with a vowel. The words far, far more and farm do not contain an  but far out will contain the linking  sound because the next word starts with a vowel sound.
An intrusive  may be inserted before a vowel in words that do not have  in the spelling. For example, drawing will sound like draw-ring, saw it will sound like sore it, the tuner is and the tuna is will both be .
Flapping
In formal speech  is retained.  in the cluster  can elide. As a result, in quick speech, words like winner and winter can become homophonous (as ). This is a quality that Australian English shares most notably with North American English.

T-glottalisation
Alveolar pronunciations nevertheless predominate.

Pronunciation of 
 The alveolar lateral approximant  is velarised  in pre-pausal and preconsonantal positions and often also in morpheme-final positions before a vowel. There have been some suggestions that onset  is also velarised, although that needs to be further researched. This is more common in South Australia than elsewhere.

Yod-dropping and coalescence
Standard Australian English usually coalesces  and  into  and  respectively.
Similarly,  has merged with  word initially.
 and other common sequences of consonant plus , are retained.
For some speakers,  (or "sh") may be uttered instead of /s/ before the stressed /tj/ sound in words like student, history, eschew, street and Australia  – As a result, in quick speech, eschew will sound like esh-chew. According to author Wayne P. Lawrence, "this phonemic change seems to be neither dialectal nor regional", as it can also be found among some American, Canadian, British and New Zealand English speakers as well.

Other features
The sequence  is realised as a voiceless palatal fricative , so that e.g. huge is pronounced .
The word data is commonly pronounced , with  being the second most common, and  being very rare.
The trans- prefix is pronounced , even in South Australia, where the trap–bath split is significantly more advanced than in other states.
In English, upward inflexion (a rise in the pitch of the voice at the end of an utterance) typically signals a question. Some Australian English speakers commonly use a form of upward inflexion in their speech that is not associated with asking questions. Some speakers use upward inflexion as a way of including their conversational partner in the dialogue. This is also common in Californian English.

Relationship to other varieties 
Australian English pronunciation is most similar to that of New Zealand English; many people from other parts of the world often cannot distinguish them but there are differences. New Zealand English has centralised  and the other short front vowels are higher.

Both New Zealand English and Australian English are also similar to South African English, so that they have even been grouped together under the common label "southern hemisphere Englishes". Like the other two varieties in that group, Australian English pronunciation bears some similarities to dialects from the South-East of Britain; Thus, it is non-rhotic and has the trap-bath split although, as indicated above, this split was not completed in Australia as it was in England, so many words that have the  vowel in Southeastern England retain the  vowel in Australia.

Historically, the Australian English speaking manuals endorsed the lengthening of  before unvoiced fricatives however this has since been reversed. Australian English lacks some innovations in Cockney since the settling of Australia, such as the use of a glottal stop in many places where a  would be found, th-fronting, and h-dropping. Flapping, which Australian English shares with New Zealand English and North American English, is also found in Cockney, where it occurs as a common alternative to the glottal stop in the intervocalic position. The word butter  as pronounced by an Australian or a New Zealander can be homophonous with the Cockney pronunciation (which can be  instead).

AusTalk 
AusTalk is a database of Australian speech from all regions of the country. Initially, 1000 adult voices were planned to be recorded in the period between June 2011 and June 2016. By the end of it, voices of 861 speakers with ages ranging from 18 to 83 were recorded into the database, each lasting approximately an hour. The database is expected to be expanded in future, to include children's voices and more variations. As well as providing a resource for cultural studies, the database is expected to help improve speech-based technology, such as speech recognition systems and hearing aids.

The AusTalk database was collected as part of the Big Australian Speech Corpus (Big ASC) project, a collaboration between Australian universities and the speech technology experts.

See also
 New Zealand English phonology
 South African English phonology
 Regional accents of English

References

Bibliography 

 
 
 
 
 
 
 
 
 Palethorpe, S. and Cox, F. M. (2003) Vowel Modification in Pre-lateral Environments. Poster presented at the International Seminar on Speech Production, December 2003, Sydney.

Further reading

External links 
 Macquarie University - Australian voices

English phonology
Australian English